Reese Witherspoon is an American actress. She made her acting debut in The Man in the Moon (1991). Her second box office performance was with Keifer Sutherland in Freeway (1996) in which Witherspoon played a youth troubled by victimization and neglect who has a violent murderous streak, but in the name of protecting vulnerable youth from sexual predation by seemingly perverted men. She then rose to prominence in 1999 with Cruel Intentions and for her portrayal of Tracy Flick in the black comedy Election, which earned her a Golden Globe Award for Best Actress – Motion Picture Comedy or Musical nomination. She achieved fame for her work on romantic comedies with her role as Elle Woods in the comedy Legally Blonde (2001) and its 2003 sequel, as well as her starring role in Sweet Home Alabama (2002). She won the Academy Award for Best Actress for her portrayal of June Carter Cash in the 2005 biographical musical film Walk the Line. She also received an Academy Award nomination for her performance in the 2014 drama Wild.

Witherspoon became a leading actress on the HBO television series Big Little Lies (2017–2019) (winning the Primetime Emmy Award for Outstanding Limited Series as an executive producer), the Apple TV+ drama series The Morning Show (2019–present), and the Hulu miniseries Little Fires Everywhere (2020).

Launching Hello Sunshine in 2014, Witherspoon has served as producer on several of her films and shows, in addition to the 2014 psychological thriller Gone Girl.

Film

Television

Video games

References

External links
 Reese Witherspoon at the Internet Movie Database

Actress filmographies
American filmographies
filmography